San Marco basin in Venice, Italy, is an area of the Venetian Lagoon that faces the Riva degli Schiavoni and Doge's Palace of the San Marco sestiere.

External links

Geography of Venice